The coital alignment technique (CAT) sex position, known colloquially as grinding the corn, is used primarily as a variant of the missionary position and is designed to maximize clitoral stimulation during sexual intercourse. This is achieved by combining the "riding high" variation of the missionary position with pressure-counterpressure movements performed by each partner in rhythm with coitus.

Technique

When used as a variant of the missionary position, the male lies above the female but moves upward along the woman's body, until his erection, which would otherwise point "up," is pointing "down", the dorsal side of the penis now pressing against the clitoris. As opposed to the missionary position, the male's body moves downward (relative to the female's) during the inward stroke, and upward for the outward stroke. She may also wrap her legs around his. Sexual movement is focused in the pelvises, without leverage from the arms or legs. The rocking upward stroke (where the female leads) and downward stroke (where the male leads) of sexual movement builds arousal that partners let develop and peak naturally.

The woman on top variant is known as the reverse coital alignment technique.

History of studies
The technique for coital alignment was first defined by American psychotherapist Edward Eichel, and the original study was published by Eichel, De Simone Eichel, and Kule in 1988 in the Journal of Sex & Marital Therapy.

Since then, the topic has been studied several times in the same journal. A 1992 report by Kaplan and her sex therapist trainees described the team's cursory trial of the CAT, acknowledging that they may have resorted to old routines after only a few attempts out of fear of disappointing their partners.  Their call for other sex therapists to give the technique more rigorous testing instigated a series of controlled studies by Hurlbert and colleagues reporting statistically significant results in the treatment of female hypoactive sexual desire.

References

Further reading

 
 Paul Wolf on Eichel and CAT:  

Sex positions